Bellefontaine High School is a public high school in Bellefontaine, Ohio, United States. It is part of the Bellefontaine City Schools district. They are members of the Central Buckeye Conference and were formerly members of the Western Buckeye League.

Notable alumni 

 Austin Eldon Knowlton - architect and businessman

References

External links
 District Website
 Bellefontaine High School

High schools in Logan County, Ohio
Public high schools in Ohio